Udhabaani is a 2009 Maldivian romantic horror feature film directed by Amjad Ibrahim. Produced by Hamid Ali under Learner's Production, the film stars Yoosuf Shafeeu, Amira Ismail, Hamid Ali and Aminath Shareef in pivotal roles. Upon release, the film received mixed reviews from critics, although it performed well at the box office, making it Ibrahim's most successful venture.

Plot
Lathaa (Amira Ismail) is a school student who belongs to the inferior social class where her parents, Adamfulhu (Hamid Ali) and Mariyam Manike (Aminath Shareef), work all day to earn an income hoping to sustain basic necessities. One night, Adamfulhu goes fishing and is dragged into the sea by a supernatural force. Concerned about him, Mariyam Manike searches for him and finds him at the fishing spot sitting idle. On his return, Lathaa and Mariyam Manike observe differences in his habits; forgetting his daily chores and distancing himself from religious acts. Lathaa, who is in a romantic relationship with Laami (Yoosuf Shafeeu), a shopkeeper, sees a black shadow at the beach, causing them to stop meeting there.

Two nights later, Laami comes to Lathaa's house and tries to rape her after she refuses to have sex with him. Mariyam Manike opens the door in time and kicks him out. The next morning Laami's father storms out on him for harassing Lathaa, which Laami had no memory of. Lathaa was expelled from school and her father warns her about her relationship with Laami. To clear his suspicions, Laami and his friend, Areesh (Hussain Solah) spy on Adamfulhu and witness him transforming into a monster. After eating raw fish, he transforms back to Adamfulhu and go back to his house. A few minutes later, they observe the same man, now disguised as Laami, enter Lathaa's room.

The following day, Areesh is found dead. A spell-maker who figures out the truth through Areesh and Laami, explains the events to Mariyam Manike and hands over two amulets to be used for protection. She ties one of the amulets to Lathaa's hand but she does not have the chance to tie the next amulet on her body. The following day, the spell-maker and Mariyam Manike are found murdered in their houses.

Cast 
 Yoosuf Shafeeu as Laamiu
 Amira Ismail as Lathaafa
 Hamid Ali as Adamfulhu
 Aminath Shareef as Mariyam Manike
 Hussain Solah as Areesh

Soundtrack

Accolades

References

2009 films
Maldivian horror films
2009 horror films
Romantic horror films
Films directed by Amjad Ibrahim